This is a list of characters in the fiction of Robert A. Heinlein:

A
Allucquere (a.k.a. "Mary") – The Puppet Masters
Security Chief Juan Alvarez – The Moon Is a Harsh Mistress
Richard Ames (a.k.a. Colin Campbell) – The Cat Who Walks Through Walls
Sam Anderson – Starman Jones
Anne (Fair Witness) – Stranger in a Strange Land
Major Ardmore – Sixth Column
Pallas Athene, intelligent computer, came to life after the original personality (Minerva) transferred to become a human woman – Time Enough for Love, The Cat Who Walks Through Walls, To Sail Beyond the Sunset

B
Dr. Hartley M. Baldwin (a.k.a. Gregory "Kettle Belly" Baldwin, "Mr. Two-Canes") – Gulf, Friday, The Cat Who Walks Through Walls
Col. Richard Baslim (a.k.a. "Baslim the Cripple") – Citizen of the Galaxy
Thorby Baslim (a.k.a. Thor B. Rudbek, "Rudbek of Rudbek at Rudbek") – Citizen of the Galaxy
Gillian Boardman (Jill) – Stranger in a Strange Land
Joseph Bonforte – Double Star
Eunice Branca – I Will Fear No Evil
Jacob Burroughs – The Number of the Beast, The Cat Who Walks Through Walls
Hilda Burroughs (nee Hilda "Sharpie" Corners) – The Number of the Beast, The Cat Who Walks Through Walls, To Sail Beyond the Sunset
Thomas and Patrick Bartlett – Time for the Stars

C
Colonel Colin Campbell (a.k.a. Richard Ames) – The Cat Who Walks Through Walls
Dejah Thoris "Deety" Burroughs Carter – The Number of the Beast, The Cat Who Walks Through Walls
Zebadiah John Carter – The Number of the Beast, The Cat Who Walks Through Walls
Ben Caxton – Stranger in a Strange Land
Eldreth Coburn – Starman Jones
Grace Cormet – We Also Walk Dogs
Hilda Corners – see Hilda Burroughs
Ed Cowen – The Star Beast
Cynthia Craig – The Unpleasant Profession of Jonathan Hoag
Cuddlepup – The Star Beast

D
John Ezra Dahlquist (Johnny) – The Long Watch. Referred to (under the name Ezra Dahlquist) in Space Cadet.
Daniel Boone Davis – The Door into Summer
Hazel Meade Davis (Sadie Lipschitz) (Gwendolyn Novak) The Cat Who Walks Through Walls (see also Hazel Stone below)
Manuel Garcia O'Kelly Davis (Mannie) – The Moon Is a Harsh Mistress, The Cat Who Walks Through Walls
Doctor-Livingston-I-Presume (cat) – Farnham's Freehold
Matt Dodson – Space Cadet
Dora (computer) – Time Enough for Love, The Number of the Beast, The Cat Who Walks Through Walls
Dora Smith (Adorable Dora) (Dorable) – Time Enough for Love
Dorcas – Stranger in a Strange Land
Dr. Archibald Douglas – Let There Be Light
Chief Dreiser – The Star Beast

F
Duke Farnham – Farnham's Freehold
Grace Farnham – Farnham's Freehold
Hugh Farnham – Farnham's Freehold
Karen Farnham – Farnham's Freehold
Justin Foote – Methuselah's Children
Justin Foote 45th – Time Enough for Love, The Cat Who Walks Through Walls
Friday a.k.a. Marjorie Baldwin – Friday
Clark Fries – Podkayne of Mars
Podkayne Fries – Podkayne of Mars
Dr. Ftaeml – The Star Beast
Fuzzy Britches (flat cat) – The Rolling Stones

G
Larry Gaines – The Roads Must Roll
Galahad – Time Enough for Love
Gay Deceiver – The Number of the Beast, To Sail Beyond the Sunset, The Cat Who Walks Through Walls
Gekko – Red Planet
Frederica "Ricky" Gentry – The Door into Summer
Alec Graham / Alex Hergensheimer – Job: A Comedy of Justice
Joe Green – Gulf
Sergei Greenberg – The Star Beast
Joe-Jim Gregory – Orphans of the Sky
Oscar Gordon – Glory Road (also appears briefly in The Number of the Beast)

H
Delos D. Harriman – The Man Who Sold the Moon, Requiem, To Sail Beyond the Sunset
Jubal Harshaw – Stranger in a Strange Land, The Number of the Beast, The Cat Who Walks Through Walls, To Sail Beyond the Sunset, Citizen of the Galaxy (as James J. Garsh)
Don Harvey – Between Planets
Gretchen Henderson, daughter of Ingrid and Jinx Henderson – The Moon Is a Harsh Mistress, The Cat Who Walks Through Walls, To Sail Beyond the Sunset
Ingrid Henderson Jinx Henderson's wife, direct descendant of Hazel Stone – The Cat Who Walks Through Walls
Jinx Henderson, born John Black Eagle, took Ingrid Henderson's surname when he married her – The Cat Who Walks Through Walls
Wolf Henderson, Ingrid and Jinx Henderson's son – The Cat Who Walks Through Walls
Alex Hergensheimer / Alec Graham – Job: A Comedy of Justice
Mortimer "Mort the Wart" Hobart – The Moon Is a Harsh Mistress
Mycroft "Mike" Holmes (a.k.a. Adam Selene, Mychelle Holmes) – The Moon Is a Harsh Mistress
Myra Holtz – The Star Beast
Ira Howard – Methuselah's Children
Jonathan Hoag – The Unpleasant Profession of Jonathan Hoag
Hugh Hoyland – Orphans of the Sky

J
William 'Tex' Jarman – Space Cadet
Oscar Jensen – Space Cadet
Maureen Johnson – see Maureen Johnson Smith, below
Joseph – Farnham's Freehold
Max Jones – Starman Jones
Zebadiah Jones – If This Goes On—

K
Karen – Gulf
Henry Gladstone Kiku – The Star Beast
Wyoming Knott (Wyoh) – The Moon Is a Harsh Mistress

L
Stuart Rene LaJoie – The Moon Is a Harsh Mistress
Andrew Jackson Libby, later Elizabeth A. J. Libby Long – Misfit, Methuselah's Children, Time Enough for Love, The Cat Who Walks Through Walls. Also known as "Slipstick" Libby, and in Misfit, has the nickname "Pinky". The Number of the Beast
Elizabeth Andrew Jackson Libby Long (originally Andrew Jackson Libby) – The Number of the Beast a.k.a. "Pinky" and "Slipstick"
Maureen Johnson Smith Long – see Maureen Johnson Smith, below
Lapis Lazuli Long – Time Enough for Love, The Number of the Beast
Llita – Time Enough for Love
Lazarus Long (a.k.a. Woodrow Wilson Smith) – Methuselah's Children, Time Enough for Love, The Number of the Beast, The Cat Who Walks Through Walls, To Sail Beyond the Sunset
Lorelei Lee Long – Time Enough for Love, The Number of the Beast
Lummox – The Star Beast
John Lyle – If This Goes On—

M
Mr. MacClure – The Star Beast
Dr. Mahmoud (a.k.a. "Stinky") – Stranger in a Strange Land
Margrethe – Job: A Comedy of Justice
Jim Marlowe – Red Planet
Dr. Mary Lou Martin – Let There Be Light
Mary (a.k.a. "Allucquere") – The Puppet Masters
Helen Mayberry – Time Enough for Love
Gloria McNye – Delilah and the Space Rigger
Memtok – Farnham's Freehold
Minerva – intelligent computer used to run the planet Secundus, later transformed into a human woman – Time Enough for Love, The Cat Who Walks Through Walls, To Sail Beyond the Sunset
Miriam – Stranger in a Strange Land
Frank Mitsui – Sixth Column
Mycroft – see Mycroft "Mike" Holmes, above, The Moon Is a Harsh Mistress
Mother Thing – Have Space Suit—Will Travel

N
Andrew Nivens, a.k.a. "The Old Man" – The Puppet Masters (his name is not mentioned, only inferred – the President calls him Andrew and his son's last name is Nivens)
Elihu Nivens, a.k.a. Sam Cavanaugh – The Puppet Masters
Gwen Novak – The Cat Who Walks Through Walls
Dr. Sven Nelson – Stranger in a Strange Land

O 
 Judge O'Farrell – The Star Beast

P
Bernardo de la Paz (Prof) – The Moon Is a Harsh Mistress
Patty Paiwonski – Stranger in a Strange Land
Penny – Double Star
Petronius The Arbiter a.k.a. Pete (cat) – The Door into Summer
Peewee – Have Space Suit—Will Travel
Longcourt Phyllis – Beyond This Horizon
Hugo Pinero – Life-Line
Pixel (cat) – The Cat Who Walks Through Walls, To Sail Beyond the Sunset
Ponse, The Lord Protector – Farnham's Freehold
Pug – Glory Road

R
Random Numbers (Cat) – To Sail Beyond the Sunset
Rhysling, "Blind singer of the spaceways" – The Green Hills of Earth, Time Enough for Love
Juan Rico – Starship Troopers
Wes Robbins – The Star Beast
Rufo – Glory Road, The Cat Who Walks Through Walls
Clifford "Kip" Russell – Have Space Suit—Will Travel

S
Nehemiah Scudder – If This Goes On—
Johann Sebastian Bach Smith (later Joan Eunice Smith Solomon) – I Will Fear No Evil
Sister Maggie – If This Goes On—
Maureen Johnson Smith – Time Enough for Love, The Cat Who Walks Through Walls, To Sail Beyond the Sunset, The Number of the Beast
Valentine Michael Smith – Stranger in a Strange Land
Woodrow Wilson Smith – birth name of Lazarus Long (see above)
Lawrence Smythe (The Great Lorenzo) – Double Star
Jacob Moshe Solomon – I Will Fear No Evil
Betty Sorenson – The Star Beast
Mary Sperling – Methuselah's Children, Time Enough for Love
Star, a.k.a. Her Wisdom – Glory Road, The Cat Who Walks Through Walls
Lowell "Buster" Stone – The Rolling Stones, The Cat Who Walks Through Walls (inferred; "Hazel's youngest grandson" is the doctor treating Richard)
Castor Stone – The Rolling Stones, The Number of the Beast, The Cat Who Walks Through Walls
Edith Stone – The Rolling Stones
Hazel Stone – The Rolling Stones, The Moon Is a Harsh Mistress, The Number of the Beast, The Cat Who Walks Through Walls (see also Hazel Meade Davis, above)
Pollux Stone – The Rolling Stones, The Number of the Beast, The Cat Who Walks Through Walls
John Thomas Stuart – The Star Beast
Meade Stone – The Rolling Stones
Edith Stone – The Rolling Stones

T
John Thomas – The Star Beast
Dejah Thoris – see Dejah Carter, above
Colonel Towers – The Long Watch

V
Becky Vesey (a.k.a. Madame Alexandra Vesant) – Stranger in a Strange Land
 "Shorty" Van Kleeck – The Roads Must Roll

W
Rod Walker – Tunnel in the Sky
Ira Weatheral – Time Enough for Love
Barbara Wells – Farnham's Freehold
Willis (Bouncer) – Red Planet

External links
A Heinlein Concordance, The Heinlein Society

Heinlein, Robert A.